Hans F. Loeser (September 28, 1920 – May 15, 2010) was an American lawyer whose activism during the Vietnam War earned him the enmity of Richard Nixon.

Born in Germany, Loeser served in the United States Army, 1942–1947. He then went to Harvard Law School, where he was an Editor and Officer of the Harvard Law Review from 1948 to 1950. He graduated magna cum laude in 1950 and began a long career at Foley Hoag in Boston.

He was active in several professional groups. His work as Chair of the Boston Lawyers' Vietnam Committee landed him on the master list of Nixon political opponents. He was then a long-term member emeritus of the Lawyers' Committee for Civil Rights Under Law in Boston.

References
Boston Globe obituary
Lawyers' Committee for Civil Rights Under Law in Boston
The Cambridge Chronicle obituary

1920 births
2010 deaths
Lawyers from Boston
Harvard Law School alumni
United States Army personnel of World War II
Ritchie Boys
German emigrants to the United States
Massachusetts lawyers
American anti–Vietnam War activists
American civil rights lawyers
20th-century American lawyers